Anil Dash (born September 5, 1975) is an American technology executive, entrepreneur, Prince scholar and writer. He is the Head of Glitch and VP of Developer Experience at Fastly.

Career
In 1999, Dash launched his personal weblog, dashes.com (now anildash.com), while working as an independent technology consultant. From 2001 to 2003, he worked as a new media developer for the Village Voice  before becoming the first employee of Six Apart, the makers of Movable Type, TypePad, and Vox, where he served as a vice president until 2009.

From 2009 to 2012 he served as the director of Expert Labs, a Gov 2.0 project to facilitate political participation. After this work, he became an advisor to the White House Office of Digital Strategy under the Obama administration.

He was also previously a partner with Michael J. Wolf in Activate Consulting, a media and technology management consulting firm, and a co-founder (with Gina Trapani) and CEO of ThinkUp, a social media aggregation and analysis tool. The company was shuttered in June 2016. Dash was appointed CEO of Fog Creek Software in December 2016. On September 25, 2018, the company was renamed Glitch after its flagship product. In March 2020, Glitch and its union signed a collective bargaining agreement, the first in the tech industry.

Dash was host of Function with Anil Dash, a podcast about technology's effects on culture, co-produced by Glitch and Vox Media The podcast ran for two seasons from 2018 to 2020.

Dash is also a scholar of the musician Prince.

NFTs
In 2014, as part of a collaboration with Kevin McCoy, Dash co-created Monegraph, a blockchain-based system for verifying original digital artworks initially called monetized graphics, which has since been called the first implementation of non-fungible tokens (NFTs).

Dash has been critical of present day usage of the NFT concept, stating "The only thing we’d wanted to do was ensure that artists could make some money and have control over their work," and that co-creator "McCoy still believes that blockchain technologies can help artists sustain their work."

Recognition

In 2004, he won an SEO contest which required contestants to get the top Google ranking for the made-up phrase "nigritude ultramarine".

In 2010, Dash's weblog was an honoree in the Personal Blog/Website category of the 2010 Webby Awards. In 2022 Dash and McCoy won the Webby lifetime achievement award for the development of NFTs.

Personal life
Dash was born to Odia parents from India and grew up near Harrisburg, Pennsylvania. He lives in New York City with his wife Alaina Browne and one son.

References

Further reading

External links

 Anil Dash's weblog
 About Anil Dash
 ACTIVATE.com

1975 births
Living people
American bloggers
Writers from Harrisburg, Pennsylvania
American male writers of Indian descent
American male bloggers
Writers from New York City